Pallickal Naduvilemuri is a small village situated in the southern part of Alappuzha district, six kilometers south from Mavelikkara and six kilometers apart from Kayamkulam. It is famous for temples and it was named after that. This place belongs to Onattukara.Total 9 villages/localities come under pincode 690503. Bharanikkavu is a part of Pallickal Naduvilemuri, there are 2 other villages/localities which come under Pallickal Naduvilemuri. Nearby villages include Olakettiambalam, Kurthicad, Mullikulangra, Bharanikavu, Peringala etc.

References

kaduvinath gandharva kshethram
pallickal naduvilamuri

Villages in Alappuzha district